

This is a list of the Pennsylvania state historical markers in Allegheny County.

This is intended to be a complete list of the official state historical markers placed in Allegheny County, Pennsylvania by the Pennsylvania Historical and Museum Commission (PHMC). The locations of the historical markers, as well as the latitude and longitude coordinates as provided by the PHMC's database, are included below when available. There are currently 148 historical markers located in Allegheny County.

Historical markers

See also

List of Pennsylvania state historical markers
National Register of Historic Places listings in Allegheny County, Pennsylvania
National Register of Historic Places listings in Pittsburgh, Pennsylvania
List of City of Pittsburgh historic designations
List of Pittsburgh History and Landmarks Foundation Historic Landmarks

References

External links
Pennsylvania Historical Marker Program
Pennsylvania Historical & Museum Commission

Pennsylvania state historical markers in Allegheny County
Pennsylvania state historical markers in Allegheny County
Allegheny County
Pennsylvania state historical markers in Allegheny County
Tourist attractions in Allegheny County, Pennsylvania